Boʻston or Bustan is a city and seat of Ellikqala District in Karakalpakstan in Uzbekistan. Its population was 8,488 in 1989, and 14,400 in 2016.

References

Populated places in Karakalpakstan
Cities in Uzbekistan